Andreas "Andy" Dittmar (born 5 July 1974 in Gotha) is a German athlete specialising in the shot put. He represented his country at two outdoor and four indoor European Championships.

He has personal bests of 20.55 metres outdoors (Schönebeck 2006) and 20.34 metres indoors (Nordhausen 2005).

Competition record

References

1974 births
Living people
People from Gotha (town)
German male shot putters
Sportspeople from Thuringia
21st-century German people